Jock Anderson may refer to:

 Jock R. Anderson (born 1941), Australian agricultural economist
 John Kinloch Anderson (1924–2015), classicist